Electoral history of Gennady Zyuganov, Member of the State Duma (1993–present), and  Leader of Communist Party (1993–present). Communist presidential candidate, 1996, 2000, 2008 and 2012.

Presidential elections

1996

2000

2008

2012

References

Gennady Zyuganov
Zyuganov